Alessandro Nora (born 24 May 1987) is an Italian water polo player, currently playing for AN Brescia. He was part of the Italian team during the Olympic qualification 2016

See also
 List of Olympic medalists in water polo (men)

References

External links
 
 

1987 births
Living people
People from Mirandola
Italian male water polo players
Water polo drivers
Left-handed water polo players
Water polo players at the 2016 Summer Olympics
Medalists at the 2016 Summer Olympics
Olympic bronze medalists for Italy in water polo
Sportspeople from the Province of Modena
21st-century Italian people